Trang River is one of main rivers of Trang Province apart from Palian River.

Trang River has two origins, the first one is in Khao Luang, a summit of Nakhon Si Thammarat Range, Nakhon Si Thammarat Province. The second one is in Krabi Province, both courses southward and confluence at Banthat Range in Phatthalung Province before flowing into Trang Province.

In the province of Trang, it flows through various districts as follows: Ratsada, Huai Yot, Wang Wiset, Na Yong, Kantang and the south-east of Mueang Trang.

It has important branches including Khlong Chi (คลองชี), Khlong Tha Pradu (คลองท่าประดู่), Khlong Kapang (คลองกะปาง), Khlong Muan (คลองมวน), Khlong Yang Yuan (คลองยางยวน), Khlong Lam Phu Ra (คลองลำภูรา), Khlong Nang Noi (คลองนางน้อย), and Khlong Sawang (คลองสว่าง).

Trang River basin is a narrow area therefore a few suitable area for rice farming. In addition, there are often regular floods between October to December each year.

Trang River has a wide variety of aquatic life, the most common fish include catfish especially Hemibagrus filamentus and H. nemurus. A rare species Anguilla bicolor bicolor that is hard to find elsewhere, found easily in this river. These freshwater eels migrate from the sea to the fresh water in the river to support themselves until they are mature. They can be used to cook a wide variety of dishes and has been popular with Trang people for a long time.

Historically, the river has been associated with local history for thousands of years. It was the main thoroughfare from the Andaman coast to Thung Song in Nakhon Si Thammarat and can also continue to the Tapee River, a route that leads to Bandon Bay on the Gulf of Thailand as well. These are believed to be conditions that existed more than 1,300 years ago. There is theory on the origin of the name "Trang". According to the theory claims the name derives from a Malay word Tarangque ("dawn", "morning"), it is possible that the Malay merchants who came to trade with Ayutthaya or other empires at that time sailed along the river and arrived here at the time of dawn. And that made Trang as the main seaport of Malay Peninsula on the Andaman coast in ancient times.

Trang River in the area of Mueang Trang District known as Khlong Tha Chin or Tha Chin River (คลองท่าจีน, แม่น้ำท่าจีน; "river of Chinese piers"). It is not related to Tha Chin River in central region in any way, though the two names share a similar-sounding root. Because the sub-districts where the river passes, such as Bang Rak, Thap Thiang are settlement to the Chinese as well as the Tha Chin River in the central region.

Notes

References

Rivers of Thailand
Geography of Trang province